In the Springtime of the Year is a 1973 novel by Susan Hill. Hill has stated that the book was inspired by the sudden death of a man to whom she had been close for eight years.

Reception
A 1974 book review by Kirkus Reviews concluded; "Susan Hill is the most uncompromising of writers and this is a monochrome of rural England where lives proceed in synergistic harmony with the natural world around them were it not for that whim of fate... Once again Miss Hill's novel achieves a consummate simplicity—we cannot fault its deliberate tonelessness without acknowledging its universality."

References

Novels by Susan Hill
1973 British novels
Hamish Hamilton books